Konrad is a German (with variants Kunz and Kunze) given name that means "Bold Counselor".

People named Konrad include:
Konrad Adenauer (1876–1967), German politician, Chancellor of Germany 1949–1963 (CDU)
Konrad Arras (1876–1930), Estonian politician
Konrad Emil Bloch (1912–2000), German-born American biochemist
Konrad Boehmer (1941–2014), Dutch composer 
Konrad Bukowiecki (born 1997), Polish athlete 
Konrad Czerniak (born 1989), Polish swimmer 
Konrad Dannenberg (1912–2009), German rocket scientist
Konrad de la Fuente (born 2001), American soccer player
Konrad Dobler (born 1957), German long-distance runner
Konrad Duden (1829–1911), German philologist
Konrad Gehringer (1939–2003), German inventor
Konrad Gessner (1516–1565), Swiss naturalist 
Konrad Grob (1828–1904), Swiss painter
Konrad Heiden (1901–1966), German writer
Konrad Henlein (1898–1945), Czechoslovak politician
Konrad Hirsch (1900–1924), Norwegian-Swedish footballer
Konrad Kaspersen (born 1948), Norwegian jazz musician 
Konrad Kellen (1913–2007), American political scientist
Konrad Koch (1846–1911), German teacher and football pioneer
Konrad Knudsen (1890–1959), Norwegian painter, journalist, and parliamentarian
Konrad Knutsen (1925–2012), Norwegian civil servant
Konrad Kujau (1938–2000), German illustrator and forger 
Konrad Laimer (born 1997), Austrian Footballer 
Konrad Lorenz (1903–1989), Austrian scientist
Konrad Mägi (1878–1925), Estonian painter
Konrad Morgen (1909–1982), German SS lawyer
Konrad Nielsen (1875–1953), Norwegian philologist
Konrad Nordahl (1897–1975), Norwegian trade unionist and politician 
Konrad Püschel (1907–1997), German architect and Bauhaus student
Konrad Rudnicki (1926–2013), Polish astronomer 
Konrad Salbu (1903–1986), Norwegian chess player
Konrad Sundlo (1881–1965), Norwegian military officer and politician 
Konrad Szołajski (born 1956), Polish film director
Konrad Tuchscherer (born 1970), American historian
Konrad von Lichtenberg (1240–1299), German bishop
Konrad von Marburg (died 1233), German inquisitor
Konrad von Würzburg (died 1287), German poet
Konrad Wolf (1925–1982), German film director
Konrad Zuse (1910–1995), German computer scientist

See also
Conrad (name), given name and surname

References

Masculine given names
German masculine given names
Norwegian masculine given names
Estonian masculine given names